Nicolay may refer to:

 Nicolay (musician), Dutch musician 
 Nicolay de Caveri, Genoese cartographer
 Nicolay (family), an influential French family in the 15th to 18th centuries

People with surname Nicolay:

 Christian Nicolay (born 1976), German javelin thrower
 Franz Nicolay, American musician and composer
 Jean Nicolay (born 1937), former Belgian football goalkeeper
 John George Nicolay (1832—1901), American biographer and secretary of Abraham Lincoln
 Louis Nicolay, Belgian sports delegate
 Ludwig Heinrich von Nicolay (1737–1820), Russian-German poet, librarian, and president of the St. Petersburg Academy of Sciences
 William Nicolay (1771—1842), British soldier

See also
 Nicholas
Nicola (name)
Nicolae (name)
Nicolai (given name)
Nicolaj
Nicolao
Nicolas (given name)
Nicolau
Nicolau (surname)

Surnames from given names